Eupenifeldin is a cytotoxic bistropolone isolate of Eupenicillium brefeldianum.

References

Tropolones
Oxygen heterocycles
Heterocyclic compounds with 5 rings